Dean Ross Williams (born 8 December 1980) is an English cricketer.  Williams is a right-handed batsman who plays as a wicket-keeper.  He was born in Barrow-in-Furness, Cumbria.

Williams made his debut for Cumberland in the 2001 MCCA Knockout Trophy against the Lancashire Cricket Board.  His Minor Counties Championship debut came in the same season against Norfolk, with Williams playing Minor counties cricket for Cumberland to 2006.  In his time with Cumberland, Williams played two List A matches against the Warwickshire Cricket Board the 1st round of the 2002 Cheltenham & Gloucester Trophy which was held in 2001, and against Scotland in the 1st round of the 2004 Cheltenham & Gloucester Trophy which was held in 2003.  In his two List A matches, he scored 20 runs at a batting average of 10, with a high score of 16.

References

External links
Dean Williams at ESPNcricinfo
Dean Williams at CricketArchive

1980 births
Living people
Sportspeople from Barrow-in-Furness
Cricketers from Cumbria
English cricketers
Cumberland cricketers
Wicket-keepers